The Sahen River is a river in East Timor. It originates in central Manatuto municipality, flows in a mostly southerly direction, and then discharges into the Timor Sea at the southern tip of the border between Manatuto and Manufahi municipalities.

Course

The river rises in the portion of East Timor's central mountains situated in central Manatuto municipality. Its headwaters, located to just to the south of the town of Laclubar, are shared with two of its main tributaries, the Buarahum/Buarahuin and the Bun/Buti Rivers.

From the source confluence, the river flows south-southwest to the border between Manatuto and Manufahi municipalities, and then runs along that border, mostly in a south-southeasterly direction, until it empties into the Timor Sea at the shore of the Quirás plain, near , Manufahi.

The river is spanned by two road bridges. , the former bridge and the road leading to it were both damaged and in need of repairs.

The main tributaries of the river, in order of entrance, are as follows: 

 Bun (or Buti) River: rises a short distance southeast of Laclubar, on the border between Sucos Manelima and Orlalan, Laclubar administrative post; flows initially southeastwards, and then southwards, along that border until it reaches the tripoint of Sucos Manelima and Orlalan, Laclubar, and Suco Manlala, Soibada, where it merges with the Buarahum (or Buarahuin) River (see above) to become the source confluence of the Sahen River.
 Motana River: rises in Suco , Barique administrative post, Manatuto; flows southwesterly, mostly along the border between that suco and Suco Leo-Hat, Soibada, until it enters the Sahen River at the tripoint between those two sucos and Suco Samoro, Soibada;

Catchment

East Timor has been broadly divided into twelve 'hydrologic units', groupings of climatologically and physiographically similar and adjacent river catchments.

Economy

The catchment has been assessed as having potential for the construction of a large scale multi-purpose dam to harvest raw water and generate hydroelectricity by hydropower.

See also
 List of rivers of East Timor

References

 Wheeler, T. (2004) East Timor. Footscray, VIC; Lonely Planet.

External links

Manatuto Municipality
Manufahi Municipality
Rivers of East Timor